The Garden of Surging Waves, is a Chinese garden and city park currently under construction in Astoria, Oregon. The Astoria City Council selected the garden as city's bicentennial legacy gift in recognition of Astoria's Chinese heritage.

The Garden of Surging Waves will occupy the northwest corner of Heritage Square — the block bound by Duane, Exchange, 11th and 12th Streets, adjacent to City Hall.

History
The garden's ceremonial ground breaking took place at Heritage Square in front of Astoria City Hall on April 14, 2012.

See also

 List of botanical gardens in the United States
 List of Chinese gardens

References

External links
 Astoria Chinese Heritage, City of Astoria

Astoria, Oregon
Chinese-American culture in Oregon
Gardens in Oregon
Parks in Clatsop County, Oregon